Ramona Solberg (1921–2005) created eccentric yet familiar jewelry using found objects; she was an influential teacher at the University of Washington School of Art and often referred to as the "grandmother of Northwest found-art jewelry". She was an art instructor in and around Seattle for three decades as well as a prolific jewelry artist.

Biography
Ramona Lorraine Solberg was born 10 May 1921, in Watertown, South Dakota, but her family relocated to Seattle, Washington before Solberg's second birthday. She enlisted in the Women’s Army Corps in 1943 during the Second World War and served until 1950. Using her G.I. Bill benefits, she went to Mexico where she studied jewelry and textile design at the University of Michoacan in Morelia and textiles at the Belias Artes in San Miguel de Allende. She then studied in Oslo, Norway at Statens Kunst og Handverk Skole and worked with jewelry and enameling. Upon returning to the United States, she completed both a Bachelor's of Arts and a Master's of Fine Arts degree at the University of Washington and also studied with Ruth Pennington.

From 1951 to 1956 Solberg taught at James Monroe Jr. High School, and then worked until 1967 as an associate professor at Central Washington University in Ellensburg, Washington. From that time until her 1983 retirement, Solberg was an art professor at the University of Washington. Solberg is often associated with Pacific Northwest artists and jewelers she taught like Laurie Hall, Ron Ho, Kiff Slemmons, and Nancy Worden.

Artwork
Though Solberg made some jewelry in her studies, she did not create her first piece of jewelry using beads and found objects until 1956, while at Central Washington State College. 
Her jewelry was large, rather than typical delicate, precious jewelry. She created her jewelry to be worn and to be worn by large women.

In the 1960s, she began traveling. Her first round-the-world trip included visits to Japan, Taiwan, Hong Kong and Nepal, picking up beads at every stop. When she returned, she published a book Inventive Jewelry Making in 1972. Solberg and a Seattle group called Friends of the Crafts began making annual travels through Europe, the Middle East, Southeast Asia, Africa and even one trip to Antarctica to both study crafts in other areas and obtain artifacts that could be used in their own works.

Solberg was honored as a Fellow of the Council by the American Craft Council for leadership and ability as an artist and/or teacher. 
Craft historian Vicki Halper curated a 2001-2002 major traveling exhibition, and wrote a comprehensive, illustrated accompanying publication, after conducting an extensive (35 page transcribed) oral history.

Solberg was worked on jewelry right up to her death. She died 13 June 2005 in Seattle, Washington.

Collections 

 Museums of Contemporary Crafts in New York City 
 King County Arts Commission in Seattle, Washington
 Tacoma Art Museum in Tacoma, Washington

References

External links 

 An interview with Ramona Solberg, conducted 2001 March 23, by Vicki Halper, for the Archives of American Art

1921 births
2005 deaths
American jewellers
Artists from Seattle
Pacific Northwest artists
University of Washington faculty
People from Watertown, South Dakota
Artists from South Dakota
University of Washington alumni
Central Washington University faculty
20th-century American artists
20th-century American women artists
21st-century American artists
21st-century American women artists
American women academics
Women's Army Corps soldiers
American expatriates in Mexico
Women jewellers